The Para gecko (Gonatodes tapajonicus) is a species of lizard in the Sphaerodactylidae family native to Brazil.

References

Gonatodes
Reptiles described in 1980